Vector Group may refer to:

 Vector group, in electrical engineering
 Vector Group Ltd., an American company